Pavlo Ivanov (born 28 September 1984) is a Ukrainian football defender.

Ivanov is a product of the FC Zmina-Obolon Kyiv youth sport school and spent time playing for different Ukrainian and Belarusian teams. In 2011, he signed a contract with FC Olimpik Donetsk.

References

External links
Profile at Official Site FFU (Ukr)

1984 births
Living people
Footballers from Kyiv
Ukrainian footballers
Association football defenders
Ukrainian expatriate footballers
Expatriate footballers in Belarus
Expatriate footballers in Moldova
Ukrainian expatriate sportspeople in Moldova
Ukrainian Premier League players
FC Dnipro players
FC Dnipro-2 Dnipropetrovsk players
FC Dnipro-3 Dnipropetrovsk players
FC Nafkom Brovary players
FC Yednist Plysky players
FC Obolon-Brovar Kyiv players
FC Krasyliv players
FC Obolon-2 Kyiv players
FC Partizan Minsk players
FC Belshina Bobruisk players
FC Bukovyna Chernivtsi players
FC Olimpik Donetsk players
CSF Bălți players
FC Hoverla Uzhhorod players
FC Hirnyk-Sport Horishni Plavni players
PFC Sumy players
FC Poltava players
FC Polissya Zhytomyr players